Uray (Mansi: Урай) a town in  Khanty–Mansi Autonomous Okrug, located on the Konda River  from Khanty-Mansiysk. Population:

History
It was founded as a settlement for oil field workers. It was granted town status in 1965.

Administrative and municipal status
Within the framework of administrative divisions, it is incorporated as the town of okrug significance of Uray—an administrative unit with the status equal to that of the districts. As a municipal division, the town of okrug significance of Uray is incorporated as Uray Urban Okrug.

Economy
Uray is the organisational centre of the oil-extracting region. In 1960, the first oil field in Siberia—the Shaimskoye field—opened here). Uray is the starting point of the Shaim–Tyumen oilpipe line. TPP Uraуneftegaz OOO "LUKoil- Zapadnaya Sibir" oil reprocessor plant is located in Uray.

Other Uray industries include food and housebuilding.

Transportation
The town is served by the Uray Airport.

References

Citations

General and cited sources

External links
 Official website of Uray 
 Mojgorod.ru. Entry on Uray 
  Znamya, Uray's newspaper 

Cities and towns built in the Soviet Union
Cities and towns in Khanty-Mansi Autonomous Okrug